The Kukuya language, Kikukuya , also transcribed Kukẅa and known as Southern Teke, is a member of the Teke dialect continuum of the Congolese plateau. It is the only language known to have a phonemic labiodental nasal . The name of the language comes from the word kuya "plateau".

Phonology

Prenasalized voiceless consonants are aspirated.

Cw sequences are rare and only occur before unrounded vowels; they include . (C cannot be .) It may be possible that the frequent sounds  (which occur before , respectively) are phonemically , but  argues against this analysis. It may be possible that the frequent sounds  are phonemically , but they are not restricted as to following vowels and  argues against this analysis. Diachronically, Kukwa affricates derive from stops before close vowels or vowel sequences, and  derives from *k rather than *p.

Prenasalized affricates are generally transcribed mf, mv, ns, nz. Phonemic neutralization may occur when consonants are prenasalized: 
N +  → 
N +  →  ("mf")
N +  → 
N +  →  ("ns")
N +  →  ("nz")

Syllables are primarily CV, with some CwV and CjV; vowel-initial syllables do not occur. Roots (not counting nominal prefixes and the like) are of the forms CV, CVV, CVCV, CVVCV, and CVCVCV. In the latter case, the middle vowel is neutralized. There are only six medial consonants, and six combinations of medial C2C3 in the case of CVCVCV words, .

 posits both tone and stress, with tone being high or low, though not every syllable is assigned a tone: there are five word-tone patterns in the language. Vowels may carry two tones to accomplish this.

The labiodental nasal

A phonemic labiodental nasal, has only been reported from this one language. However, there is some doubt that a true stop can be made by this gesture due to gaps between the incisors, which are filed to points by the Teke people and would allow air to flow during the occlusion; this is particularly pertinent considering that one of the words with this consonant, means a 'gap between filed incisors'. Because of these factors, Teke  might be better characterized as a labiodental nasal approximant ( in IPA), rather than a nasal occlusive.

Given its rarity, it is worth providing some minimal pairs with other consonants:

ɱíì eyes, míì urine, pfìí small opening
kì-mààlà to complete the rest, kì-ɱààlà to laugh at
ɱé they (class 4), bvé they (class 8), fè bulb, mfê the cold
kì-ɱànàmà to rejoice, kì-bvànàmà to shake with fear
ɱáá gap between filed incisors, mbváá interval
ɱáanà baby, mà-mbvàànì to meet

Notes

References

Teke languages